The 1979 Soviet Chess Championship was the 47th edition of USSR Chess Championship. Held from 29 November to 27 December 1979 in Minsk. The tournament was won by Efim Geller. He won it at the age of 54 and was the oldest player ever to have won the Championship, and did so in a field where young players abounded as never before. The qualifying tournaments took place in Bălți and Bishkek.

Qualifying

Swiss Qualifying 
The Swiss Qualifying was held in Bălți from 8-28 August 1979 with 62 players. Nukhim Rashkovsky won gaining a direct promotion to the
final.

First League 

The top six qualified for the final.

Final  

The position after 11 rounds was exciting with Balashov, Geller, Kasparov, Kupreichik and Yusupov all sharing the lead on seven points. However, Geller finished like an express train. He had begun with seven draws before he won in rounds 8, 10, 11, 12, 14 and 15. Tal's result was catastrophic, and lost him 40 rating points. His poor form
was largely due, according to chief judge Flohr in the bulletin, to the fact that he could not resist a wave of influenza which other participants threw off without too much difficulty.

References 

USSR Chess Championships
Chess
1979 in chess
Chess